Melbourne University Boat Club is a rowing club in Melbourne, Australia. Its clubhouse or "boat shed" is listed on the Victorian Heritage Register in 2000. According its website, the club claims to be "the oldest rowing club in Australia".
In 2015, a MUBC men's eight set the fastest time for a Head of the Yarra race.

See also
 Sydney University Boat Club

References

Rowing clubs in Australia
Sporting clubs in Melbourne
Sport at Australian universities
Sport in the City of Melbourne (LGA)